Rock My Run (stylized as RockMyRun; trademarked slogan: "The Best Running Music in the World™") is a mobile running/fitness app founded in 2011 that provides running and workout music in the form of DJ mixes. It is owned by Rock My World, Inc., a technology company based in San Diego, California. The app allows users to listen to these professional DJ mixes on their smartphone while running or working out to enhance and motivate their performance.

Rock My World, Inc. also developed the app Jolt.ai for the software Slack.

History
During the early stages of the company, Rock My World, Inc. raised more than $2 million in funding generated by the Irvine Company's The Vine SD and from institutional investors including Skullcandy, ZTE and Lighter Capital and were admitted to the Plug and Play Tech Center in Sunnyvale and to the tech incubator EvoNexus in San Diego. In an interview with co-founder and ex-Qualcomm staff Adam Riggs-Zeigen, he said that "from the beginning [their] big goal is to help people live healthier lives."

Speaking for Reuters in 2014, Riggs-Zeigen said: "We want to help people enjoy running more and perform better, because those are the keys to getting them to do that activity again." Also in 2014 for ABC News, he explained: "We help people run for longer, farther and faster, and do things they never thought were possible. It's amazing how the right music combined with the right tempo does that. There's strong research that shows music paced with your stride helps improve performance by up to 15 percent. There's a lot of evidence to making sure you have the right beat for your stride."

Features
The RockMyRun app contains thousands of mixes or "stations" produced by its professional DJs intended to increase enjoyment and performance during exercise. DJs who have provided mixes for the app include David Guetta, Zedd, Steve Aoki, Major Lazer and Afrojack. All of the music can be personalized based on the user's steps per minute, heart rate or ideal cadence allowing the user to "always hear the right music at the right time at the right tempo".

All RockMyRun mixes are organized into stations to help users discover music that suits their needs. RockMyRun contains mixes of all genres and each station is categorized into their respective genres and displays tags to let users know the type of music contained in the mix.

RockMyRun has two membership types; it is free as a standard member, but for uninterrupted listening and additional features, users can upgrade to a paid "Rockstar" membership.

Reception 
RockMyRun has been featured on television programs such as The Today Show on two occasions and on The Rachael Ray Show, and in positive reviews by many publications and websites including The New York Times on four separate occasions, TIME, The Huffington Post, The Denver Post, Men's Fitness, Real Simple, The Vulcan Post, The L.A. Times, Glamour, Paste magazine, PCMag, Dubai Week, BetaNews, CNET, CNBC, Reuters, Insider, Tom's Guide and Yahoo! Tech.

RockMyRun has also been mentioned/recommended in books/publications such as A Practical Guide to Teacher Wellbeing by Elizabeth Holmes and Applying Music in Exercise and Sport by Dr. Costas Karageorghis.

In a positive review by David Strausser for AndroidGuys in 2015, he praised the app in a detailed review, saying "The mixes are incredible and the rates are reasonable. The app is quick, beautiful."

Jill Duffy touches base on some of the key features in PC Magazine in 2015. Stating that the app is great if you enjoy listening to different, or new music, that can match your tempo while running.

In 2018, Redbull.com recommended RockMyRun in preparation for the Wings for Life World Run in their article "10 essential hacks for running to work to get you in World Run shape".

In 2019, The Fashion Spot included RockMyRun in their list of "The Best Workout Apps for People Who Hate to Work Out", saying: "RockMyRun matches music to the tempo of your running pace – the music literally follows your steps/heart rate. The app has thousands of mixes/music options along with tracking capabilities."

In September 2022, VeryWellFit listed RockMyRun as the first of three "Other Playlist Options" in the article "How to Create a Running Playlist, According to Running Coaches".

In March of 2023, couples can now be on the same RockMyRun and "share" earbuds. This allows people to train together, easier. A group of DJ's curate playlists for specific training needs and different energy levels.

Partners
RockMyRun is partnered with the following brands/companies:
C25K
Del Taco
JLab Audio
iFit
Active Network, LLC
Night Nation Run (the world's first running music festival)
Lady Foot Locker
Mayweather Boxing + Fitness
Mio Global
Orangetheory Fitness
Red Rock Apps
Tapout Fitness

References

External links
 
 
 

Internet audio players
Internet properties established in 2011
Mobile applications
American music websites
DJ mixes
Exercise organizations
Exercise equipment
Fitness apps
Mobile music apps
Mobile software
Music streaming services
American companies established in 2011
2011 establishments in California
2011 software
Companies based in San Diego
Running mass media
Software companies based in California
Sports software
Android (operating system) software
IOS software
WatchOS software
Windows Phone software